Trefusiidae is a family of nematodes belonging to the order Enoplida.

Genera

Genera:
 Africanema Vincx & Furstenberg, 1988
 Alaimonemella Allgén, 1935
 Cytolaimium Cobb, 1920

References

Nematodes